Empire of the Wolves (French: L'Empire des loups) is a 2005 French action drama film directed by Chris Nahon, written by Christian Clavier, Jean-Christophe Grangé, Chris Nahon and Franck Ollivier, and starring Jean Reno, Arly Jover, and Jocelyn Quivrin.

Plot
Arly Jover plays Anna Heymes, a stylish 31-year-old Parisian housewife, who experiences nightmares and hallucinations related to a series of gruesome murders in the city. At the same time, a duo of policemen, the unorthodox Schiffer (Jean Reno) and the cautious officer Nerteaux (Jocelyn Quivrin), work to unravel the mystery surrounding the murders. The plot thickens when Anna discovers that she has been subjected to intensive reconstructive surgery, which concealed her Turkish heritage. A series of events escalates into a confrontation with the Turkish mafia and the death of Anna's would-be assassin.

Cast

 Jean Reno	as Jean-Louis Schiffer
 Arly Jover as Anna Heymes
 Jocelyn Quivrin as Paul Nerteaux
 Laura Morante as Mathilde Urano
 Étienne Chicot as Olivier Amien
 Philippe Bas as Laurent
 David Kammenos as Azer
 Didier Sauvegrain as Dr. Ackerman
 Patrick Floersheim as Charlier
 Albert Dray as the lieutenant
 Vernon Dobtcheff as Kudseyi
 Élodie Navarre as "fliquette"
 Philippe du Janerand as "légiste"
 Corentin Koskas as "l'interne"
 Jean-Pierre Martins as Professeur Ravi
 Jean-Marc Huber as Gurdilek
 Donatienne Dupont as Clothilde
 Jean-Michel Tinivelli	as Caraccili
 Sandra Moreno as Marie-Sophie
 Laurence Gormezano as Chantal
 Vincent Grass as Marius
 Guillaume Lamant-Deboudt as Lacroux
 Emmanuelle Escourrou as Gozar
 Akim Colour as "l'ouvrier"
 Gérard Touratier as Gruss
 Aurélie Meriel as "la secrétaire"
 Emre Kinay as "le policier"
 Arnaud Duléry	as "un flic médico-légal"
 Jacques Curry as Roman

Release
The film premiered on 20 April 2005 in France and was on 30 July 2005 part of the Fantasy Film Fest in München.

Soundtrack

References

External links
 
 
 

2005 films
2005 thriller films
French thriller films
2010s French-language films
Films shot in France
Films shot in Turkey
Films set in France
Films set in Turkey
Films set in Paris
Police detective films
Films based on French novels
Films based on thriller novels
Films directed by Chris Nahon
2000s French films
2010s French films